Abshot is a hamlet in Hampshire, England.  Abshot is situated on the eastern side of Southampton Water.

References

Villages in Hampshire